Queen Esther may refer to:

 Esther Montour, Iroquois woman of northeastern Pennsylvania from the mid-1700s
 Queen Esther, the biblical character
 Queen Esther (painting), an 1878 portrait of Esther
 Queen Esther Marrow (born 1941), soul and gospel singer
 Queen Esther (artist), musician, performer, writer and vocalist